The 1987 Centennial Cup is the 17th Junior "A" 1987 ice hockey National Championship for the Canadian Junior A Hockey League.

The Centennial Cup was competed for by the winners of the Abbott Cup, Dudley Hewitt Cup, the Callaghan Cup, and a 'Host' team.

The tournament was hosted by the Humboldt Broncos in the city of Humboldt, Saskatchewan.

The Playoffs

Round Robin

Results
Humboldt Broncos defeated Dartmouth Fuel Kids 7-2
Richmond Sockeyes defeated Dartmouth Fuel Kids 7-3
Humboldt Broncos defeated Pembroke Lumber Kings 4-2
Humboldt Broncos defeated Richmond Sockeyes 6-1
Richmond Sockeyes defeated Pembroke Lumber Kings  4-1
Pembroke Lumber Kings defeated Dartmouth Fuel Kids 8-4

Semi-finals and Final

Awards
Most Valuable Player: Frank Romeo (Richmond Sockeyes)
Top Scorer: Jason Phillips (Richmond Sockeyes)
Most Sportsmanlike Player: Jason Phillips (Richmond Sockeyes)

All-Star Team
Forward
Bill McDougall (Humboldt Broncos)
Duncan Ryhorchuk (Humboldt Broncos)
Jason Phillips(Richmond Sockeyes)
Defence
Rob Rice (Humboldt Broncos)
Matt Hervey (Richmond Sockeyes)
Goal
Grant Robb (Pembroke Lumber Kings)

Roll of League Champions
AJHL: Red Deer Rustlers
BCJHL: Richmond Sockeyes
CJHL: Pembroke Lumber Kings
IJHL: Charlottetown Abbies
MJHL: Selkirk Steelers
MVJHL: Dartmouth Fuel Kids
NOJHL: Nickel Centre Power Trains
OJHL: Owen Sound Greys
PCJHL: Quesnel Millionaires
SJHL: Humboldt Broncos

See also
Canadian Junior A Hockey League
Royal Bank Cup
Anavet Cup
Doyle Cup
Dudley Hewitt Cup
Fred Page Cup
Abbott Cup
Mowat Cup

External links
Royal Bank Cup Website

1987
Cup
Humboldt, Saskatchewan
Ice hockey competitions in Saskatchewan